The ASCAP Foundation Richard Rodgers Award is an annual award presented by the American Society of Composers, Authors and Publishers (ASCAP), in recognition of lifetime achievement by composers and lyricists in musical theatre. Established by Dorothy Rodgers in honor of her late husband Richard Rodgers, the award was first presented to Howard Dietz in 1983. The honor was not presented in 1992, 1994, 2004, or 2005, and years with more than one recipient include 1984, 1990, 1993, 1995, and 1997.

The most recent recipient is Stephen Schwartz, who was presented the award in 2011. Betty Comden is the only female to receive the award. American composers or lyricists have received the Richard Rodgers Award each year it has been presented except in 1988 when British-born Jule Styne won the honor.

Recipients

See also
 ASCAP Foundation Richard Rodgers New Horizons Award

References

General
 

Specific

External links
 American Society of Composers, Authors and Publishers' official site
 ASCAP Foundation

American music awards
Awards established in 1983
Foundation Richard Rodgers Award